

All-time league record
Statistics correct as of match played on March 18, 2023.

All-time MLS Cup record
Statistics correct as of match played on October 30, 2022.

All-time CONCACAF Champions League record
Statistics correct as of match played on March 14, 2023.

All-time U.S. Open Cup record
Statistics correct as of match played on April 20, 2022.

References

 
American soccer clubs records and statistics